The 1879 Iowa gubernatorial election was held on October 14, 1879. Incumbent Republican John H. Gear defeated Democratic nominee Henry H. Trimble with 53.94% of the vote.

General election

Candidates
Major party candidates
John H. Gear, Republican
Henry H. Trimble, Democratic 

Other candidates
Daniel Campbell, Greenback
David R. Dungan, Prohibition

Results

References

1879
Iowa